The 2022 Superbike World Championship was the 35th season of the Superbike World Championship. The championship was won by Álvaro Bautista, he became World Champion in 2022 after finishing 2nd in Race 2 at the Mandalika round.

Race calendar and results

The provisional 2022 season calendar was announced on 25 November 2021.
On 30 July 2022, Ducati achieved the 1000th podium in Superbike World Championship.

Entry list

Rider changes 
 Team HRC signed rookies Iker Lecuona and Xavi Vierge, replacing veteran riders Álvaro Bautista and Leon Haslam.
 Supersport rider Luca Bernardi was signed by Barni Racing.
 Scott Redding switched from Ducati to BMW, replaced by Álvaro Bautista.
 Bonovo Racing signed Eugene Laverty and Loris Baz, replacing Jonas Folger.
 Team GoEleven announced the signing of Philipp Öttl, who moved from the Supersport World Championship.
Hafizh Syahrin switched from Moto2 to WorldSBK with MIE Honda Racing.
Tarran Mackenzie (2021 British Superbike champion) was expecting to participate in three wildcard events at Assen, Donington Park, and a third circuit to be confirmed, riding a factory Yamaha instead of his usual McAMS British-specification superbike. Mackenzie was injured in BSB pre-season testing and did not participate in the first wildcard entry at Assen.
Peter Hickman was announced as a wild card for the Donington Park event, riding his usual British Superbike BMW M1000RR, with suitable alterations including a World Superbike specification CPU.

Championship standings
Points were awarded as follows:
Race 1 and Race 2

Superpole Race

Riders' championship

Teams' championship

Manufacturers' championship

Notes

References

External links 

Superbike
Superbike World Championship seasons